God's Country and the Law is a 1921 American silent drama film produced by Pine Tree Pictures and distributed by Arrow Films. It was directed by Sidney Olcott with Fred C. Jones and Gladys Leslie in the leading roles. It was adapted from the 1915 novel God's Country and the Woman by James Oliver Curwood, which had been previously filmed under that title in 1916.

Cast
Fred C. Jones as André
Gladys Leslie as Marie
William H. Tooker as Jacques Doré
Cesare Gravina as 'Poleon
Hope Sutherland as Oachi

Preservation
A print is preserved at the Library of Congress and the National Archives of Canada, Ottawa.

References

External links

 God's Country and the Law website dedicated to Sidney Olcott.

American silent feature films
Films directed by Sidney Olcott
American black-and-white films
Silent American drama films
1921 drama films
1921 films
Remakes of American films
Northern (genre) films
Films based on works by James Oliver Curwood
Arrow Film Corporation films
1920s American films